Olaf Hansen Frønsdal (11 October 1906 – 30 October 1986) was a Norwegian boxer who competed in the 1924 Summer Olympics. In 1924 he was eliminated in the second round of the featherweight class after losing his fight to the eventual gold medalist Jackie Fields.

References

External links
Part 5 the boxing tournament

1906 births
1986 deaths
Featherweight boxers
Olympic boxers of Norway
Boxers at the 1924 Summer Olympics
Norwegian male boxers
20th-century Norwegian people